Nicolás Arredondo (17 March 1950 – 1987) was a Mexican boxer. He competed in the men's middleweight event at the 1976 Summer Olympics. At the 1976 Summer Olympics, he lost to Siraj Din of Pakistan.

References

1950 births
1987 deaths
Mexican male boxers
Olympic boxers of Mexico
Boxers at the 1976 Summer Olympics
Boxers at the 1975 Pan American Games
Pan American Games bronze medalists for Mexico
Pan American Games medalists in boxing
Place of birth missing
Middleweight boxers
Medalists at the 1975 Pan American Games
20th-century Mexican people